The 2014 Košice Open was a professional tennis tournament played on clay courts. It was the twelfth edition of the tournament which was part of the 2014 ATP Challenger Tour. It took place in Košice, Slovakia between 9 and 14 June 2014.

Singles main-draw entrants

Seeds

 1 Rankings are as of May 26, 2014.

Other entrants
The following players received wildcards into the singles main draw:
  Marko Daniš
  Patrik Fabian
  Dominik Šproch 
  Robin Staněk

The following players received entry from the qualifying draw:
  Frank Dancevic
  Blazej Koniusz
  Michal Pažický
  Andriej Kapaś

Doubles main-draw entrants

Seeds

1 Rankings as of May 26, 2014.

Other entrants
The following pairs received wildcards into the doubles main draw:
  Marko Daniš /  Patrik Fabian
  Filip Havaj  /  Juraj Šimčák
  Michal Pažický /  Dominik Šproch

Champions

Singles

 Frank Dancevic def.  Norbert Gombos, 6–2, 3–6, 6–2

Doubles

 Facundo Argüello /  Ariel Behar def.  Andriej Kapaś /  Błażej Koniusz, 6–4, 7–6(7–4)

External links
Official website

Kosice Open
Košice Open
Kos